Zoltán Székely (Hungarian: Székely Zoltán; 8 December 1903 in Kocs, Hungary – 5 October 2001 in Banff, Canada) was a violinist and composer.

Biography
Székely studied violin with Jenő Hubay and composition with Zoltán Kodály at the Franz Liszt Academy in Budapest. He composed mainly chamber music. Székely toured Europe with the virtuoso young cellist Paul Hermann. Székely was a friend of Béla Bartók and was the one to request the composition of Bartók's Second Violin Concerto and its dedicatee as well as performer at its premiere in March, 1939, Mengelberg conducting. The performance was a live broadcast and was recorded by Radio Hilversum on 78 RPM acetates, the most used recording medium at the time. For several years he lived in the Netherlands and from 1940–1941 he was leader/concertmaster of the Royal Concertgebouw Orchestra under Willem Mengelberg. He later went to live in the USA and Canada. Zoltan Szekely joined the Hungarian String Quartet in its second year, and played the first violin from 1937 until the quartet disbanded in 1972. He was named Honorary Professor by the Franz Liszt Academy in 1981, which marked Bartók's centenary.

Székely transcribed Bartók's Romanian Folk Dances for violin and piano.

References

External links
 

1903 births
2001 deaths
Franz Liszt Academy of Music alumni
Academic staff of the Franz Liszt Academy of Music
Hungarian composers
Hungarian male composers
Hungarian classical violinists
Male classical violinists
Players of the Royal Concertgebouw Orchestra
20th-century classical violinists
20th-century Hungarian male musicians